Myself World Tour is a live video album by Taiwanese singer Jolin Tsai. It was released on October 19, 2013, by Warner and Mars. It chronicled the Taipei dates of the Myself World Tour from December 22 to 23, 2012 and one music video.

Tsai's previous labels D Sound and Sony authorized an array of copyrighted tracks being included on the album, and it was the most completed live video album of her career to this date. In Taiwan, the album peaked at number one on a series of weekly video album sales charts, and it topped the year-end video album sales chart of Five Music.

Background 
On August 13, 2010, Tsai release her eleventh studio album, Myself. It sold more than 65,000 copies in Taiwan, and it became the year's highest-selling album by a female artist and the year's fourth highest-selling album overall in the country. On December 24, 2010, Tsai embarked on her third tour Myself World Tour.

On September 14, 2012, Tsai released her twelfth studio album, Muse. It sold more than 100,000 copies in Taiwan, and it became the year's highest-selling album by a female artist and the year's third highest-selling album overall in the country. Myself World Tour concluded on April 13, 2013, at Kaohsiung Arena in Kaohsiung, Taiwan. Comprising 35 shows, the tour grossed NT$1.5 billion and played in front of 600,000 people from 31 cities in Asia, Europe, and Oceania.

Release and promotion 

On September 27, 2013, Tsai announced the live video album for Myself World Tour would be available for pre-order on October 2, 2013 and would be released on October 19, 2013, she also revealed that her previous labels—D Sound and Sony had authorized an array of copyrighted tracks being included on the album, and it became the most completed live video album of her career to this date.

On October 2, 2013, Tsai held a press conference for the album in Taipei, Taiwan, and she announced she would hold signing sessions for the album on October 19, 2013 in Taichung, on October 20, 2013 in Kaohsiung and Tainan, and on October 27, 2013 in Taipei. On October 18, 2013, Tsai held the premiere of the live video album on the ship of Great River Queen in New Taipei, Taiwan. On October 27, 2013, Warner announced that the album topped the video album sales chart of Chia Chia, Eslite, Five Music, G-Music, and Pok'elai in its first week of release. On November 6, 2013, Tsai held a five-day Myself World Tour Exhibition at Huashan 1914 Creative Park in Taipei, Taiwan to exhibit 16 costumes and some stage props of the tour. In 2013, the album reached number three and number one on the yearly video album sales charts of Kuang Nan and Five Music, respectively.

Accolades 
On March 27, 2014, Tsai won a QQ Music Award for Best Concert Video.

Track listing

Release history

References

External links 
 

2013 live albums
2013 video albums
Jolin Tsai live albums
Jolin Tsai video albums
Warner Music Taiwan live albums
Warner Music Taiwan video albums